Chironidae is a family of beetles belonging to the superfamily Scarabaeoidea. Chironidae are primitive looking scarab beetles that occur in Africa, Asia (predominantly India) and Madagascar. 

The following genera are included in Chironidae:
Amphiceratodon Huchet, 2000
Chiron MacLeay, 1819
Theotimius Huchet, 2000

References 

 

Beetle subfamilies
Scarabaeidae